Beauvallon may refer to the following places:

 Beauvallon, Drôme, a commune in the Drôme department, France
 Beauvallon, Rhône, a commune in the Rhône department, France
 Beauvallon, Alberta, a hamlet in Alberta, Canada